This is a record of Slovakia's results at the FIFA World Cup. The FIFA World Cup is an international association football competition contested by the men's national teams of the members of Fédération Internationale de Football Association (FIFA), the sport's global governing body. The championship has been awarded every four years since the first tournament in 1930, except in 1942 and 1946, due to World War II.

The tournament consists of two parts, the qualification phase and the final phase (officially called the World Cup Finals). The qualification phase, which currently take place over the three years preceding the Finals, is used to determine which teams qualify for the Finals. The current format of the Finals involves 32 teams competing for the title, at venues within the host nation (or nations) over a period of about a month. The World Cup Finals is the most widely viewed sporting event in the world, with an estimated 715.1 million people watching the 2006 tournament final.

Slovakia have appeared in the finals of the FIFA World Cup on one occasion in 2010 where they reached the second round.

FIFA World Cup record

1930 to 1994 – See Czechoslovakia

Slovakia at the 2010 FIFA World Cup
Slovakia were drawn in group F of the 2010 FIFA World Cup.

Coach: Vladimír Weiss

New Zealand vs Slovakia

Slovakia vs Paraguay

Slovakia vs Italy

Second Round - Netherlands vs Slovakia
The Netherlands and Slovakia played on 28 June 2010 at the Moses Mabhida Stadium in Durban. The Netherlands won 2–1. The Netherlands' first goal was an excellent individual effort from Arjen Robben in the 18th minute, taking on the Slovakian defence with the ball before scoring from 25 yards. The Dutch had chances to extend their lead in the second half; Arjen Robben cut inside on his left foot just like he did when he scored the first goal, but this time the slovak goalkeeper Jan Mucha saved the shot going to his far post. The Slovaks also had 2 big opportunities to equalize but forced 2 great saves from Maarten Stekelenburg. The Dutch however in the 84th minute sealed their win, with Wesley Sneijder scoring off an assist from Dirk Kuyt into an unguarded net after Kuyt got the ball past the Slovak keeper. Róbert Vittek slotted a penalty kick late in stoppage time, but it was no more than a consolation goal for Slovakia. The penalty had been awarded for a trip on Vittek by the Dutch goalkeeper Maarten Stekelenburg. The Netherlands' win threatened to be overshadowed by Robin van Persie responding angrily to being substituted by coach Bert van Marwijk. Van Marwijk called a team meeting over the incident, and insisted later that there was no residual unrest in the squad.

Record players
Six players were fielded in all four of Slovakia's World Cup matches in 2010, making them record players for their country.

Top goalscorers

References

External links
Slovakia at FIFA

 
Countries at the FIFA World Cup
Fifa World Cup